Auhelawa is an Austronesian language found in Nuakata Island and the southeastern tip of Normanby Island in Milne Bay Province, Papua New Guinea. It was spoken by about 1,200 people in 1998, 30% of whom were monolingual in the language.

The literacy rate for first-language speakers is 85%, and is also 85% for second-language users. There are translated Bible portions into the language from 1986–1993.

ʼAuhelawa examples 

A:  ('My friend, hello. Where are you going?')

B:  ('I am going to the garden. I dig my new garden. Where did you go?')

A:  ('I went down to the village to see one of our uncles. Next week I will build his new house.')

B:  ('I also want to help our uncle. When you go down to housebuild, you come and get me and we go down and work.')

A:  ('Good. We will see you.')

Phonology

Vowels

Consonants 

 occurs only in loanwords.

Writing system 
ʼAuhelawa is written in the Latin script. About 85% of the population is literate.

References

Nuclear Papuan Tip languages
Languages of Milne Bay Province